The Smile (Live at Montreux Jazz Festival, July 2022) is the first live album by the English rock band the Smile, released on 14 December 2022 by XL Recordings. It was recorded at Montreux Jazz Festival set on 12 July. The Smile announced the album the day before its release, backed by a concert film on YouTube, which was available to view for 48 hours.

Reception 

 

Spins Jonathan Rowe said the album demonstrated that the Smile were "no mere studio project" but "an actual, organic live band". In Pitchfork, Zach Schonfeld wrote: "Since the beginning, the Smile have been dogged by an eminently reasonable question: how is this not just two Radioheads stacked in a trench coat? The answer is right there in the title of this release. This band plays jazz, see." Both critics expressed disappointment that the album did not include the new songs the Smile had performed on their tour.

Track listing 

 All track titles have "Live at Montreux Jazz Festival" in parentheses at the end.

Personnel 
 Thom Yorke – vocals, guitar, bass
 Jonny Greenwood – guitar, bass
 Tom Skinner – drums
 Mikko Gordon – engineering

References 

2022 live albums
The Smile albums
XL Recordings live albums
Live albums recorded in Switzerland